A regional service commission (RSC) is an administrative entity in the province of New Brunswick, Canada. As the name implies, an RSC administers services on a regional level.

RSCs are not incorporated municipal entities and lack direct taxation powers.

A 2021 white paper recommends major reforms to New Brunswick's local governance system to take effect in 2023, with increased RSC responsibilities and some boundary adjustments.

Functions
RSCs are required to provide regional planning, local planning in local service districts (LSD) and participating local governments, solid waste management, policing collaboration, emergency measures planning, and facilitating cost-sharing agreements between member governance units.

History
Before the creation of RSCs, regional planning and waste management were managed by two systems of planning commissions and solid waste commissions; these sets of commissions divided the province in different ways.

Finn Report
The concept of a regional administrative body that replaced existing regional commissions in a unified body was proposed by the Finn Report in 2008 as part of a sweeping reform of the province's local governance bodies. Twelve RSCs would administer services in 53 municipalities with boundaries based on communities of interest rather than existing municipal and LSD boundaries.

The Graham government shelved the Finn Report shortly after it was released, with Graham telling reporters it would be a mistake to implement the changes during the 2008 financial crisis.

Creation
RSCs were created by the Alward government in 2012, taking effect on 1 January 2013. The initial boards consisted of mayors of the member municipalities and rural communities and LSD representatives appointed by the provincial government.

Instead of using the RSC boundaries proposed by Finn, the Alward government based RSC boundaries on existing governance units. The period between announcement and implementation allowed for municipalities and LSDs to request transfer to another RSC; Belledune, Saint-Quentin, and Hampton all took advantage of this policy to successfully lobby for a change in which RSC they would belong to.

Board
Each RSC is governed by a board consisting of all mayors within the RSC and a number of LSD chairs based on a formula combining population and tax base, to a minimum of four and a maximum of ten LSD members; deputy mayors and two LSD chairs serve as alternates. LSD representatives and alternates are chosen by a meeting of all LSD chairs in the RSC; in theory, the Minister of Environment and Local Government may appoint LSD representatives if there are not sufficient chairs to fill the board positions but this rarely if ever happens.

Language
The Official Languages Act (OLA) applies to all RSCs with a 20% linguistic minority, a city, or a municipality with a 20% linguistic minority. As of 2017 eight RSCs are subject to the OLA.

List of regional service commissions
The twelve RSCs were originally given only numbers, counting clockwise from the northwestern corner of the province. Listed here according to their original number, most chose to adopt more descriptive names.

Unless noted, RSC board of director minutes do not list LSD representatives' home LSDs.

Northwest Regional Service Commission
The NWRSC (French Commission de services régionaux Nord-Ouest or CSRNO) serves primarily francophone communities in the northwestern corner of the province, including all of Madawaska County, western Restigouche County, and northern Victoria County.

The 23 members comprise one city, three towns, four villages, two rural communities, and 13 LSDs.

There were originally five LSD representatives on the board of directors (BOD); this was reduced to four following the incorporation of Haut-Madawaska in 2017.

Language Obligations under the OLA apply. Board minutes are unilingual but available in both languages.

Restigouche Regional Service Commission
The RRSC (French CSRR) serves most of Restigouche County and is the smallest RSC.

The 25 members comprise one city, one town, five villages, one rural community, and 16 LSDs.

The BOD includes four LSD representatives whose home LSDs are usually noted.

Language Obligations under the OLA apply. Board minutes are bilingual.

Chaleur Regional Service Commission
The CRSC (French CSRC) serves western and central Gloucester County and the eastern edge of Restigouche County.

The 21 members comprise one city, one town, four villages, and 15 LSDs.

The BOD includes four LSD representatives.

Language Obligations under the OLA apply. Board minutes are bilingual.

Acadian Peninsula Regional Service Commission
Serves eastern Gloucester County and Alnwick Parish.

The 45 members comprise three towns, 10 villages, one regional municipality, and 31 LSDs.

Greater Miramichi Regional Service Commission
Serves most of Northumberland County plus the rural community of Upper Miramichi.

The 23 members comprise one city, two villages, one rural community, and 19 LSDs.

Kent Regional Service Commission
Serves Kent County and Rogersville Parish.

The 27 members comprise two towns, four villages, one rural community, and 20 LSDs.

Southeast Regional Service Commission
Serves Westmorland and Albert Counties.

The 39 members comprise two cities, three towns, nine villages, one rural community, and 24 LSDs.

Regional Service Commission 8
Serves eastern Kings County plus three LSDs in Queens County.

The 18 members comprise two towns, two villages, and 14 LSDs.

Fundy Regional Service Commission
Serves Saint John County, western Kings County, and southwestern Queens County.

The 14 members comprise one city, three towns, one village, and nine LSDs.

Southwest New Brunswick Service Commission
Serves most of Charlotte County, Manners Sutton Parish, and McAdam Parish.

The 28 members comprise three towns, four villages, one rural community, and 20 LSDs.

Capital Region Service Commission
Serves Sunbury County, most of York County, most of Queens County, and Clarendon Parish.

The 42 members comprise one city, two towns, nine villages, one rural community, and 29 LSDs.

Western Valley Regional Service Commission
Serves Carleton County, most of Victoria County, and Canterbury and North Lake Parishes in York County.

The 36 members comprise three towns, seven villages, and 26 LSDs.

References

Government of New Brunswick